Lafond is a hamlet in northern Alberta, Canada within the County of St. Paul No. 19.

Demographics 
Lafond recorded a population of 35 in the 1991 Census of Population conducted by Statistics Canada.

See also 
List of communities in Alberta
List of hamlets in Alberta

References 

Hamlets in Alberta
County of St. Paul No. 19